Mallampalli Sarabheswara Sarma (27 March 1928 – 13 April 2007), popularly known as 'Sarabhayya', was a well-known Indian poet, critic, translator and exponent of classical literature.

Biography
Sarabhayya began writing poetry at twelve and won laurels for his poems from the stalwarts like Sri Chellapilla Venkata Sastry, Sri Katuri Venkateswara Rao and Viswanatha Satyanarayana. He was fondly called 'Bala Kavi Kesari' by them. He spent most of his time in cultural capital of Andhra Pradesh 'Rajahmundry'.

Sarabhayya had his traditional Sanskrit gurukula education at his father and completed the 'pancha kavyas' before he was thirteen years old.

He published his poems in various literary magazines and reviewed many books under the pen name 'pavaki'.

Sri Viswanadha held Sarabhayya's views in high esteem and eagerly waited for his remarks on his poems. The Kavisamrat made it a point to recite first to Sarabhayya and then only to others.

Awards and honours
In 1997, he received the Raja-Lakshmi Literary Award for his contribution to literature. He also won Gupta Foundation Award and many titles and awards.

Sarabhayya's article 'Sahrudayabhisaranam' was considered the best literary article and was prescribed for the high school students by the Government of Andhra Pradesh.

His works
Sarabhayya's works include poems, dramas, translations, commentaries, articles, and reviews.

Poems
Sri Venugopala satakam
Sri Bhradrakali satakam
Jaladhi Seekarm

Dramas
Malavikagnimitram
Vikramourvaseeyam

Translations
Kumarasambhavam (From Sanskrit to Telugu)
Lalladevi Vakkulu (From Kashmiri to Telugu)
Basaveswaravachanani (from Kannada to Sanskrit)

See also

Sri Raja-Lakshmi Foundation

References

External links
Essay on Sarabhayya by Sri Vadrevu Chinaveerabhadrudu

Indian male poets
1928 births
2007 deaths
20th-century Indian poets
20th-century Indian male writers